Give Me More may refer to:

 "Give Me More" (Tara McDonald song), 2012

See also
 "Gimme More", a 2007 song by Britney Spears